Franconia is a hymn tune by Johann Balthasar König adapted by William Havergal. It first appeared in König's Harmonischer Liederschatz chorale book published in 1738. The most common text for the hymn is "Blest Are the Pure in Heart" by John Keble.

Common texts 
Blest Are the Pure in Heart
The Advent of our King
We Give Thee but Thine Own
Within the Father's House

References 

Hymn tunes
Choral compositions